Bahria Town Lahore is a privately owned gated suburb located within union council 122 (Maraka) in Iqbal Tehsil of Lahore, Punjab, Pakistan. The suburb was developed and is owned by the Bahria Town Group.

The community of Bahria Town Lahore has the Bahria Grand Mosque which is the third-largest mosque in Pakistan.

Sub-divisions 

Bahria is divided into sectors, which are further divided into blocks.

Gallery

References

3. Zaitoon City Lahore - Retrieved January 28, 2010.

Iqbal Town, Lahore
Bahria Town